The 1972 IHF Olympic American qualification tournament was held in the United States. The winner of the tournament qualified for the 1972 Summer Olympics.

Standings

Matches
''All times are local (UTC−5).

References

External links
Todor66

Qualification tournament - America
Olympics tournaments
February 1972 sports events in the United States